Padniewko  is a village in the administrative district of Gmina Mogilno, within Mogilno County, Kuyavian-Pomeranian Voivodeship, in north-central Poland.

The village has a population of 399. It was first mentioned in the 12th century. It is now becoming a suburb of Mogilno.

References

Padniewko